A dome car is a type of railway passenger car that has a glass dome on the top of the car where passengers can ride and see in all directions around the train. It also can include features of a coach, lounge car, dining car, sleeping car or observation. Beginning in 1945, a total of 236 were delivered for North American railroad companies. Three companies manufactured dome cars for North America: American Car and Foundry, Budd, and Pullman-Standard. In addition, the Southern Pacific Railroad constructed seven dome-lounges in its own shops.

List

Budd

Pullman-Standard

American Car and Foundry

Southern Pacific 
{| class="wikitable sortable"
! Owner !! Quantity !! Road numbers !! Type !! Year !! Article
|-
| Southern Pacific Railroad
| 7 
| 3600–3606
| Lounge
| 1954–1955
|3/4 Domes SP Shops
|

See also 
 Dome lounge

References 
 

Passenger railroad cars